The Magnolia Commercial Historic District encompasses the historic heart of Magnolia, the county seat of Columbia County, Arkansas.  It includes the courthouse square and most of the buildings which face it, as well as buildings along Calhoun and Jackson Streets.  The centerpiece of the district is the square itself and the Columbia County Courthouse, a Renaissance Revival structure built in 1905 to a design by W. S. Hull.  The square is lined with mostly brick-faced buildings built between about 1899 and 1910, and between 1938 and 1958, when the city experienced a second building boom.  The oldest known surviving building, then as now housing a pharmacy, is located at 111 S. Court Square.  One prominent building from the second building phase is the Cameo Theater Building (111 N. Jackson), an Art Deco design built in 1948.

The district was listed on the National Register of Historic Places in 2008.

See also
National Register of Historic Places listings in Columbia County, Arkansas

References

Art Deco architecture in Arkansas
Buildings designated early commercial in the National Register of Historic Places
Historic districts on the National Register of Historic Places in Arkansas
National Register of Historic Places in Columbia County, Arkansas
Magnolia, Arkansas